is a passenger railway station  located in the city of Tottori, Tottori Prefecture, Japan. It is operated by the West Japan Railway Company (JR West).

Lines

Station layout
The station consists of one ground-level island platform connected to the wooden station building by a level crossing. The station is unattended.

Platforms

History
Mochigase Station opened on December 20, 1919. With the privatization of the Japan National Railways (JNR) on April 1, 1987, the station came under the aegis of the West Japan Railway Company.

Passenger statistics
In fiscal 2020, the station was used by an average of 66 passengers daily.

Surrounding area
Tottori City Hall Yase Town General Branch
Tottori City Chiyonami Junior High School

See also
List of railway stations in Japan

References

External links 

 Mochigase Station from JR-Odekake.net 

Railway stations in Tottori Prefecture
Stations of West Japan Railway Company
Railway stations in Japan opened in 1919
Tottori (city)